Delaware Investments was a US-based asset management firm with $174.2 billion in assets under management as of September 30, 2016  with 132 portfolio managers, analysts, and traders.  It is a wholly owned subsidiary of Macquarie Group, an Australian global financial services group.

In April 2017, Delaware Investments was rebranded as Macquarie Investment Management, effectively ending the original entity. The US funds continue to be managed under the "Delaware Funds by Macquarie" brand. In 2020, Macquarie Investment Management began acquisition of Overland Park, Kansas based asset manager Waddell and Reed (Ivy Funds).

History

Delaware Investments commenced business in 1929 and introduced its first mutual fund in 1938.

Delaware Investments introduced institutional separate account management in 1972. Its Taft-Hartley business established 1974. 

In 1990 Delaware Investments established its International/Global capabilities.

In 2000, Delaware Investments enhanced its the fixed income capabilities and in 2007 it launched Delaware Investments Global Funds plc.

Delaware Investments was acquired by Macquarie Group in 2010 and in 2017 became Macquarie Investment Management, a business unit of the group.

References

External links
 
 Macquarie Group, Parent Company of Delaware Investments, macquarie.com
 Hoover's Profile of Delaware Investments, hoovers.com

Mutual funds of the United States
Financial services companies established in 1929
Financial services companies disestablished in 2017
Companies based in Philadelphia
2010 mergers and acquisitions